September Nights is a 1957 Czechoslovak film directed by Vojtěch Jasný.

Cast
 Václav Lohniský
 Ladislav Pešek
 Stanislav Remunda
 Zdeněk Řehoř
 Jiří Vala
 Vladimír Menšík
 Josef Bláha
 Jiří Sovák
 Vlastimil Brodský
 Libuše Havelková
 Marie Tomášová
 Jaroslav Mareš
 Vladimír Brabec
 Jiřina Steimarová
 Miloš Vavruška

External links
 
 Zářijové noci at the Česko-Slovenská filmová databáze

1957 films
Czechoslovak drama films
1950s Czech-language films
Films directed by Vojtěch Jasný
Czech drama films
1950s Czech films